In telecommunication, a message Base station is a predetermined or prescribed spatial or time-sequential arrangement of the parts of a message that is recorded in or on a data storage medium.

At one time, messages prepared for electrical transmission were composed on a printed blank form with spaces for each part of the message and for administrative entries.

Telecommunication theory
Data transmission